Sliders is an American science fiction and fantasy television series created by Robert K. Weiss and Tracy Tormé. It was broadcast for five seasons between 1995 and 2000. The series follows a group of travelers as they use a wormhole to "slide" between different parallel universes. Tracy Tormé, Robert K. Weiss, Leslie Belzberg, John Landis, David Peckinpah, Bill Dial and Alan Barnette served as executive producers at different times of the production. For its first two seasons, it was produced in Vancouver, British Columbia. It was filmed primarily in Los Angeles, California, in the last three seasons.

The first three seasons were broadcast by the Fox network. After being canceled by Fox, the series moved to Sci Fi Channel for its final two seasons. The final episode was shown in the United Kingdom in December 1999, and on the Sci Fi Channel in February 2000.

Plot

The show's titular characters are a group of people who travel ("slide") between different Earths in parallel universes via a vortex-like wormhole, activated by a handheld timer device. While the slide technology was intended to return them to their home universe, their premature use of the timer to escape a dangerous situation has caused the timer to lose track of the coordinates for their home universe.

Now, they are forced to slide between universes, spending anywhere from minutes to months there, waiting for the timer to count down to the next time they can open a vortex to a new universe, hoping it is their original one. Failing to use the vortex to slide at that point would mean they would be stuck in that universe for nearly three decades until they can open the vortex again.

While waiting for the timer countdown, the Sliders frequently explore the nature of the alternate universe and often become caught up in events of that world. Some of these universes are based on alternate timelines in which certain historical events happened differently from the history they know, such as one in which penicillin was never discovered or a world on which America had lost the Revolutionary War, while other worlds have entirely novel histories, such as one where time flowed in reverse, or where dinosaurs never became extinct.

The main initial cast included Quinn Mallory (Jerry O'Connell), who created the Sliding technology, Professor Maximillian Arturo (John Rhys-Davies), Quinn's mentor; Wade Welles (Sabrina Lloyd), Quinn's friend; and Rembrandt "Cryin' Man" Brown (Cleavant Derricks), a professional singer who is accidentally caught in the first major test of the vortex. Over the course of the show, cast members departed and were replaced by others: Captain Maggie Beckett (Kari Wuhrer), a military officer from one doomed alternate Earth; Colin Mallory (Charlie O'Connell), Quinn's lost brother; a second Quinn Mallory (Robert Floyd) that resulted from the original Quinn inadvertently merging with the Quinn of a world they slid into, and Dr. Diana Davis (Tembi Locke), a scientist who attempts to help them reverse the process.

Episodes

Cast

Main

* While Sabrina Lloyd returned as a guest, she provided only the voice for her character, played by a barely-visible body-double.

Recurring
 Angus Rickman (first portrayed by Roger Daltrey for 2 episodes and then by Neil Dickson for 4 episodes): A colonel and Maggie's superior officer.
 Elston Diggs (portrayed by Lester Barrie): A bartender.
 Oberon Geiger (portrayed by Peter Jurasik): Diana's boss.
 Mrs. Mallory (portrayed by Linda Henning): Quinn's adoptive mother on Earth Prime
 Michael Mallory (portrayed by John Walcutt): Quinn's father whose Earth Prime version died when Quinn was young.
 Gomez Calhoun (portrayed by Will Sasso)
 Pavel Kurlienko (portrayed by Alex Bruhanski): A taxi driver.

Production
Michio Kaku explains in the appendix of his book, The Future of the Mind, that the Sliders series began "when a young boy read a book. That book is actually my book Hyperspace, but I take no responsibility for the physics behind that series."

While filming the episode "Desert Storm", actor Ken Steadman (Cutter) was killed. In an accident that occurred between takes, Steadman moved a dune buggy to the next shooting location. While he was moving the vehicle, the dune buggy overturned and crushed him, killing him instantly. According to Steadman's parents, his death was preventable.

Entering into the fifth season, the production team knew the series was not being renewed and had saved money from the budget of each season five episode for use in a climactic battle for the season finale. The money was instead used for the penultimate episode, "Eye of the Storm", while the last episode ended with an unresolved cliffhanger. Insiders have various theories as to why this happened. The producers were concerned the Sci Fi Channel had lost interest in the show (even though it was their highest-rated program at the time) after they ceased supplying corrective notes for the episodes, and it was believed they were not even reading the scripts.

One strict rule the Sci Fi Channel had was that a gun couldn't be pointed at a person's head. To test this rule, executive producer Bill Dial presented a script featuring a character getting his head shot completely off—which was ignored. Dial then presented the script for the final episode cliffhanger, which was also ignored. Some claim this was done to encourage fans to push for a sixth season, but members of the production team claim that the decision was personal.

Iranian-American director Reza Badiyi is credited with directing a number of the episodes in the fifth season, and his daughter, Mina Badiyi, makes a guest appearance in Episode 3, "Common Ground".

Changing cast and crew 

Sliders had a turbulent history due to changes in the cast and crew through its run. Cleavant Derricks is the only cast member to stay with the series throughout its entire run. Derricks and Linda Henning (Mrs. Mallory) are the only actors to appear in both the first and last episodes of the series. Derricks' identical twin, Clinton Derricks-Carroll, appeared in the episodes "The King Is Back", "Greatfellas", and "The Prince of Slides", when there was a need for Rembrandt and his double to interact.

Third season transitions 
Jerry O'Connell felt the first two seasons went smoothly, but then there was a significant shift in creative direction of the series with the third season, with the Fox network desiring it to be a more action-oriented show than thought-provoking. John Rhys-Davies was the first star of the series to leave. Rhys-Davies stated in a 2016 interview that he had been critical of how the show was written, calling the concept what "could've been the best show on television", but most of the scripts he had been given were "incomprehensible gibberish" and missed the potential of the concept. He cited that Fox had exerted too much control on the scripts as part of the reason for his departure.

In a 2014 interview at the Toulouse Game Show, Rhys-Davies stated that the inability to get writers that had read science fiction in the first place led to the show's downfall, and their inexperience in the area led to the show often repurposing ideas from other works. He said, "We did an episode like Tremors, one like Twister, one like The Night of the Living Dead and even one like Doctor Moreau's Island, using the film's original masks!" He found the writers were just "looting" these ideas rather than using these as a tribute, pointing to one episode where Quinn needed to cross an invisible bridge and on approaching the writer about it, discovered he had never seen Indiana Jones and the Last Crusade which Rhys-Davies had starred in and simply used the idea instead of toying with the meta nature of the scene.

For Rhys-Davies, "the breaking point for me was when I walked in and saw the writers sitting around looking at a DVD of Species which had just been released and saying: 'Look, we could take a bit of that scene there and a bit of that scene there.'"

The series co-creator, Tracy Tormé, has often been critical of the direction the series took in the third season. Tormé called the third season two-parter "Exodus" "one of the worst pieces of television ever produced, and the low point of the entire series". David Peckinpah was brought onto the series in the third season (around the time when Tormé started to criticize the show). The last episode to be written by Tormé was K1803, "The Guardian", and the first to be written by Peckinpah was K1815, "Murder Most Foul". Some argue Peckinpah's involvement in the series (and by extension Fox's more hands-on involvement) caused the show to "jump the shark", despite new executive producer Marc Scott Zicree's decision to restore Tracy Tormé's original "alternate history" premise for the series in season 4. Tormé, along with co-creators Robert K. Weiss and John Landis, all departed the show during the third season.

Part of Fox's involvement in the third season was to shift production from Vancouver to Los Angeles to reduce filming costs. The recurring characters were dropped due to the expense of flying them from Vancouver to Los Angeles for filming. Bartender Elston Diggs was brought in as a recurring character for six episodes, but Peckinpah eventually rejected the concept. Logan St. Clair was created to be a recurring character, which is evident in the episode's dialogue, but only appeared once. Fox did not believe she was "sexy" enough and requested she not appear again.

Cancellation by Fox and pickup by Sci-Fi 
Fox cancelled the show after the third season, but it was later picked up by the Sci-Fi network. Jerry O'Connell felt that Sci-Fi was looking to maintain the action-based show with more emphasis on darker sci-fi elements. Lloyd decided not to return to the series when it was revived, according to her agency. A source came forward claiming Lloyd was fired because she was jealous of Kari Wuhrer. Universal and Lloyd's agent both refused to comment and the rumour spread.

Much later it was revealed that Lloyd and Wuhrer did not get along, primarily due to some snide comments Wuhrer had made about Lloyd's engagement to a crew member. As Peckinpah wanted to return to the 3 male/1 female dynamic of the first two seasons, it was decided Lloyd was no longer required after she asked for a raise. Her character's fate—to be trapped in a Kromagg breeding camp—was allegedly Peckinpah's idea, and one that was pushed through by him alone.

As a result of public pressure to elaborate on what happened to Wade after she disappeared, the producers asked Lloyd to guest star in one season five episode that was to focus entirely on Wade (without the rest of the cast). Lloyd requested $40,000 to appear, the same per-episode salary Derricks was receiving and $20,000 more than Wuhrer, and the idea was scrapped. However, the episode she was to appear in, "Requiem", was "fine tuned" to answer this question without her. Lloyd ultimately provided voiceovers for the episode, and a stand-in was used.

By the end of the fourth season, Jerry and Charlie O'Connell left the series to pursue film careers. Jerry O'Connell felt that without Lloyd, Rhys-Davies, and Tormé, that much of the show's original premise was gone, and opted to leave. The brothers leaving the show upset many fans and Tracy Tormé was asked what could be done to win them back. This resulted in an unsuccessful effort to bring back some popular previously recurring characters.

The producers negotiated with John Novak (Ross J. Kelly, the ambulance-chasing lawyer), Alex Bruhanski (Pavel Kurlienko, the taxi driver) and Lester Barrie (Elston Diggs the waiter at the Chandler Hotel) for their return in season five. Zoe McLellan (Logan St. Clair) was scheduled to appear again and Jason Gaffney (Conrad Bennish, Jr) from season one was confirmed for four episodes including the season finale. However, none of these guest stars appeared.

Broadcast

Season 1
Quinn, eager to demonstrate his vortex technology to Prof. Arturo and Wade, inadvertently opens a large wormhole that draws Rembrandt with them to a hostile ice-covered Earth. Quinn is forced to activate the vortex prematurely to save them, and they find themselves unable to return to their Earth. So not to be stranded on any alternate Earth for over 20 years, the group continues to slide between worlds, many of them involving alternate histories, such as if the British had won the Revolutionary War, or if antibiotics had never been discovered.

Season 2
The group continues to slide between alternate Earths, exploring further alternate timelines and more fantastical variations from the Earth they know. On one slide, they encounter the Kromaggs, an alien species that have perfected sliding and use it to strip resources from alternate earths. The Kromaggs become aggressively curious about Quinn's technology.

Season 3
As they continue to slide, hoping to return to their prime dimension, the Sliders land on an Earth that is doomed by a passing pulsar, they provide a means to evacuate a small portion of its population to a safe dimension; however, the exodus is betrayed by a new enemy in Colonel Rickman who needs brain fluid to survive a disease he obtained in a gulf war.  While protecting Quinn Prof. Arturo sacrifices himself. The group, now joined by Captain Maggie Beckett, pursue Rickman to acquire a Timer he stole with Earth Prime's location saved into it. While Wade and Rembrandt make it back, Quinn and Maggie end up stuck on another alternate Earth.

Season 4
Quinn and Maggie find a way to return to Earth Prime, but they find it taken over by the Kromaggs; they are able to rescue Rembrandt but not Wade. Quinn's mother tells him he is actually adopted, born from parents that knew of sliding technology and used it to hide him from the Kromaggs.  She also tells him where to find his brother, Colin, who then joins the Sliders. The group continue to slide, hoping to find a means to deal with the Kromaggs on Earth Prime and in other dimensions.

Season 5
In what at first appears to be a freak sliding accident, Quinn merges with the Quinn of the dimension they have slid into, merging them into "Mallory", while Colin is lost to the vortex, as explained to them by Dr. Diana Davis, a scientist studying transdimensional travel. She later slides with Mallory, Maggie, and Rembrandt as they continue to search for a way to stop the Kromaggs. Ultimately, they discover a contagious virus, deadly to Kromaggs. After the timer is destroyed, they find they can send one slider back to Earth Prime. Rembrandt injects himself with the virus and jumps through, leaving the three unsure of his fate.

Broadcast order 
The Fox Network aired certain episodes from seasons one and two in a different order than originally scripted to best capitalize on potential ratings-winning episodes, thus causing some continuity errors. For instance, the timer is first set to count down not in the pilot episode, but in "Summer of Love"—since Fox aired "Fever" right  after the pilot episode, though, many viewers were left confused as to why the Sliders suddenly had to leave within a very specific period of time. Similarly, the cliffhanger at the end of "Summer of Love" leads directly into the opening of "Prince of Wails", which Fox had actually aired a week earlier.

For season two, Fox did not want to resolve the cliffhanger at the end of "Luck of the Draw", preferring to focus instead on brand-new storylines. Thus, in "Time Again and World" (the first episode filmed for Season Two), Arturo makes a brief passing reference to the events of "Luck of the Draw."  This missed cliffhanger was particularly significant as the episode had ended with Quinn being shot in the back. Tracy Tormé successfully petitioned for a chance to resolve the cliffhanger, though, which is briefly dealt with in the opening minutes of "Into the Mystic" (the third episode filmed, but the first to air that season) where the life-threatening wound is now merely a flesh wound in his shoulder, allowing for a quick recovery. "Time Again and World" ended up airing sixth in the rotation.

"Double Cross" was filmed as the premiere for season three. In this episode, the audience learns why the Sliders will now be able to slide anywhere between San Francisco and L.A. Fox opted to air "Rules of the Game" first, since it was a more action-oriented episode.

"The Last of Eden" was filmed before John Rhys-Davies left the show. Fox chose to air the episode for the first time on March 28, a full month after Arturo had been written off the show, requiring a new opening scene be added to frame the story as a flashback.

When the show began airing in reruns on the Sci Fi Channel, Sci Fi restored the original filmed order for season one. When the DVDs were released, Universal used the aired order for all seasons.

Home media 
Universal Studios Home Entertainment has released all five seasons on DVD in Region 1, 2, and 4. The fifth and final season was released in Region 1 on January 17, 2012, almost 4 years after season 4.

On December 2, 2014, Universal released Sliders- The Complete Series on DVD in Region 1.  This set contains all 88 episodes of the series on 22 single sided discs with a run time of 66 hours (3954 minutes).

On July 1, 2016, it was announced that Mill Creek Entertainment had acquired the rights to the series in Region 1 and would re-release the complete series on DVD on October 4, 2016.  The 15-disc set contains all 5 seasons of the series in correct story order.

On August 23, 2007, Netflix Instant View started providing all five seasons of Sliders available for streaming. Two season 1 episodes ("Last Days", and "The Weaker Sex") are missing with a note in their place stating that the DVD is required to view the episode. The first episode, "Pilot", is available both as one combined episode, and as two separate parts, "Pilot Part 1" and "Pilot Part 2". All episodes of the remaining seasons (2-5) are available for streaming.

On March 12, 2008, Universal Studios added Sliders season one to their free online viewing service, Hulu. Season two was added on May 8, 2009, and season three was added on July 2, 2009.

In late 2008, season five and eventually all five seasons were made available through iTunes TV Shows store.

As of August 2020, all episodes are available with free version of Peacock TV streamer. Pilot episode is split into two approximately 45 minute segments. Note that series was originally listed as "Drama" rather than "Sci-Fi" (since corrected as of Sept 2020). UPDATE: discovered on February 2023 that all episodes were moved behind the paywall of Peacock TV. They are no longer available via free version.

Revival 
Both Jerry O'Connell and John Rhys-Davies have spoken of a potential revival of the series as recently as 2019. According to Rhys-Davies, O'Connell had been in private talks with him over a possible revival, which Rhys-Davies said he would do if the series stayed focused on the thought-provoking aspects of the alternate worlds. The two have spoken to NBC about this, as the rights to distribute Sliders are believed to be held by NBCUniversal. O'Connell has also said that Torme is interested in a revival as well. On 14 July 2021, Torme stated in an interview that a Sliders reboot is actively in the works.

Connection to other works

Doorways 
The plotlines in Sliders are all set around the idea of a multiverse, where the outcomes of non-deterministic quantum processes result in the splitting of reality into multiple universes, each existing in parallel. There has also been speculation that Sliders was inspired by George R. R. Martin's 1992 ABC pilot Doorways, in which the main cast were fugitives fleeing through parallel worlds, while carrying a device that tells them where and when the next Doorway opens.

Although scripts for six additional episodes after the pilot film were completed, Doorways never went to series, as ABC decided to launch Lois and Clark: The New Adventures of Superman instead in the fall of 1993. At the time of Sliders''' launch, Evelyn C. Leeper noted the similarities to Doorways, and in response to rumors that Sliders creator Tracy Tormé applied for a writing position on the show, Martin clarified in a 1995 post on GEnie that it was Tormé's agent that inquired about the position, and Tormé has denied any connection between the two.

 Sliders in other media 

 Sliders-branded works 
 The pilot episode of Sliders was novelized by science-fiction writer Brad Linaweaver, and was released in the spring of 1996, one year after the series originally premiered. Linaweaver's novelization incorporates several deleted scenes from the original pilot episode production script, along with Linaweaver's own additions to the plot.
 Linaweaver also later compiled an episodic guide to the show, Sliders: The Classic Episodes, which contained information only on Seasons One through Three.
 Dennis McCarthy produced a Sliders soundtrack in 2007 with complete scores to both the episodes from the first season he scored, which included the pilot.  As of late 2010, no other scoring from the series' other composers has been released.
 Sliders was also spun off into a 10 issue comic book series published by Acclaim Comics in 1996. This comics series had no direct input from series creators Tracy Tormé and Robert K. Weiss, but Tracy Tormé did pass along several notes detailing stories that went unproduced. Series star Jerry O'Connell also personally authored one special issue of this comic series. While advertised and solicited for advance order, the eleventh and final Sliders comic, titled Get a Life, never made it to store shelves; but artist Rags Morales completed art for 14 pages of the comic before production was stopped.
 Sliders trading cards were produced by Inkworks in 1997. The set consisted of 90 cards, including nine embossed cards, six foil cards combining to make a large portrait of the Kromagg homeworld, two lenticular cards, and one promotional card by the Official Sliders Fan Club.

References by others
 After the changes of the DC Comics event mini-series Zero Hour, the artistic design of time travel was changed and first introduced in Legion of Super-Heroes vol. 3 number 74. During the issue, Superboy comments that this new artistic design of time travel is similar to the tunnel effect on Sliders.  This new artistic design for time travel has been used by DC Comics from the 1995 debut through to its last appearance in 2005 in the Teen Titans/Legion Special.
 In the December 19, 1996 FoxTrot strip by Bill Amend, Frosty the Snowman condemns Paige for watching Sliders instead of his own Christmas television special.
 In 1997, the Desktop Images production company released a training video on the subject of Organic Modeling and Animation hosted by David Lombardi. This how-to video gave a special behind the scenes look at the special effects process used on the Sliders season three episodes Paradise Lost and Dinoslide.
 Marvel's Exiles features several Marvel characters who have been pulled from their own realities to fix problems in alternate ones. Series creator Judd Winick has stated that Sliders was part of the inspiration for the series.
 Released February, 2005, Marvel Knights 4 issue 15 features the Human Torch fondly remembering Sliders as the fantastic team prepares to embark on a time travel mission.
 The September 14, 2007 issue of online comic VG Cats (#243: Bizzaro!) features Leo mentioning Sliders, followed by a scene in a parallel universe into which the original line-up (Rembrandt, Arturo, Quinn and Wade) slide. The timer states they are there for three years.
 Funny or Die featured an April Fool's sketch where O'Connell tried to crowdfund a Sliders movie.
 Jerry O'Connell appears as Lancelot in an episode of the series The Librarians which featured alternate Earths.
 The Family Guy episode "Road to the Multiverse", which features Brian and Stewie traveling through various parallel universes, was originally going to be called Sliders''.

References

External links

  
 
 
 

 
1990s American science fiction television series
1995 American television series debuts
2000s American science fiction television series
2000 American television series endings
Alternate history television series
English-language television shows
Fox Broadcasting Company original programming
Syfy original programming
Television series about being lost from home
Television series about parallel universes
Television shows set in Los Angeles
Television shows set in San Francisco
Television series by Universal Television
Television shows filmed in Vancouver
Television shows filmed in Los Angeles
American television series revived after cancellation
Fiction about wormholes